Flommen Golf Club is a links golf club located in Falsterbo, Skåne County in Sweden. It has hosted the PLM Open on the European Tour.

History
The club was established in 1935 which makes it the country's 19th oldest golf club. It is located on Sweden's southwestern tip, along the Baltic Sea, adjacent to Falsterbo Golf Club and near Ljunghusen Golf Club. Situated in the Flommen Nature Preserve amongst shallow lagoons and high dunes, it is one of few links courses in the country.

The club has hosted the PLM Open on the European Tour. New Zealand's Frank Nobilo recorded his first European Tour victory at the 1988 PLM Open, while eventual world number one Vijay Singh made his European Tour debut, and then-rookie Colin Montgomerie recorded his first top-3 European Tour finish at the same tournament.

Tournaments hosted

European Tour
PLM Open – 1988

Flommen Open
Flommen head pro Gunnar  Mueller was the initiator to the 1993 foundation of the Flommen Open professional tournament, which was run for ten years until 2002.

Winners
1993 Fredrik Andersson
1994 Christian Härdin 
1995 Cancelled due to flooding
1996 Johan Girdo
1997 Fredrik Henge
1998 Ville Lemon
1999 Niklas Bruzelius
2000 Kalle Brink
2001 Klas Eriksson
2002 Per Nyman

See also
List of links golf courses
List of golf courses in Sweden

References

External links

Golf clubs and courses in Sweden